France competed at the 1956 Summer Olympics in Melbourne, Australia and Stockholm, Sweden (equestrian events). 137 competitors, 119 men and 18 women, took part in 95 events in 15 sports.

Medalists

Gold
 Alain Mimoun — Athletics, Men's Marathon
 Michel Rousseau — Cycling, Men's 1000m Sprint (Scratch) 
 Arnaud Geyre, Maurice Moucheraud, and Michel Vermeulin — Cycling, Men's Team Road Race 
 Christian d'Oriola — Fencing, Men's Foil Individual

Silver
 Georges Dransart and Marcel Renaud — Canoeing, Men's C2 10,000m Canadian Pairs
 René Bianchi, Jean Graczyk, Jean-Claude Lecante, and Michel Vermeulin — Cycling, Men's 4000m Team Pursuit 
 Arnaud Geyre — Cycling, Men's Individual Road Race 
 Bernard Baudoux, Roger Closset, René Coicaud, Christian d'Oriola, Jacques Lataste, and Claude Netter — Fencing, Men's Foil Team

Bronze
 René Libeer — Boxing, Men's Flyweight
 Gilbert Chapron — Boxing, Men's Middleweight
 Daniel Dagallier, Yves Dreyfus, Armand Mouyal, Claude Nigon, and René Queyroux — Fencing, Men's Épée Team
 Renée Garilhe — Fencing, Women's Foil Individual
 Yves Delacour, Guy Guillabert, René Guissart, and Gaston Mercier — Rowing, Men's Coxless Fours 
 Jean Debuf — Weightlifting, Men's Middle Heavyweight

Athletics

Men's 110m Hurdles 
Jean-Claude Bernard
 Heat — 14.7s
 Semifinals — 14.6s (→ did not advance)
Edmond Roudnitska
 Heat — 14.3s
 Semifinals — 14.9s (→ did not advance)

Men's Marathon 
Alain Mimoun — 2:25:00 (→ Gold Medal)

Basketball

Boxing

Canoeing

Cycling

Sprint
Michel Rousseau —  Gold Medal

Time trial
Renzo Colzi — 1:15.1 (→ 16th place)

Tandem
André GruchetRobert Vidal — 5th place

Team pursuit
Jean GraczykJean-Claude LecanteMichel VermeulinRené Bianchi — 4:39.4 (→  Silver Medal)

Team time trial
Arnaud GeyreMaurice MoucheraudMichel Vermeulin — 22 points (→  Gold Medal)

Individual time trial
Arnaud Geyre — 5:23:16 (→  Silver Medal)
Maurice Moucheraud — 5:23:40 (→ 8th place)
Michel Vermeulin — 5:23:40 (→ 12th place)
René Abadie — 5:27:28 (→ 27th place)

Diving

Women's 10m Platform
Nicole Péllissard-Darrigrand 
 Preliminary Round — 50.02 
 Final — 78.80 (→ 4th place)

Fencing

18 fencers, 15 men and 3 women, represented France in 1956.

Men's foil
 Christian d'Oriola
 Claude Netter
 Jacques Lataste

Men's team foil
 Claude Netter, Bernard Baudoux, Jacques Lataste, Roger Closset, Christian d'Oriola, René Coicaud

Men's épée
 René Queyroux
 Armand Mouyal
 Daniel Dagallier

Men's team épée
 Armand Mouyal, Claude Nigon, Daniel Dagallier, Yves Dreyfus, René Queyroux

Men's sabre
 Jacques Lefèvre
 Jacques Roulot
 Claude Gamot

Men's team sabre
 Claude Gamot, Jacques Lefèvre, Bernard Morel, Jacques Roulot

Women's foil
 Renée Garilhe
 Catherine Delbarre
 Régine Veronnet

Gymnastics

Modern pentathlon

One male pentathlete represented France in 1956.

Individual
 Jean-Claude Hamel

Rowing

France had 13 male rowers participate in two out of seven rowing events in 1956.

 Men's coxless four
 René Guissart
 Yves Delacour
 Gaston Mercier
 Guy Guillabert

 Men's eight
 Santé Marcuzzi
 Émile Clerc
 Richard Duc
 Maurice Bas
 Édouard Leguery
 Jean-Jacques Vignon
 Maurice Houdayer
 René Massiasse
 Jacques Vilcoq

Sailing

Shooting

Five shooters represented France in 1956.

25 m pistol
 Charles des Jammonières

50 m pistol
 Charles des Jammonières

50 m rifle, three positions
 Jacques Mazoyer
 Maurice Racca

50 m rifle, prone
 Jacques Mazoyer
 Maurice Racca

Trap
 Robert Pignard
 Michel Prévost

Swimming

Weightlifting

Wrestling

References

External links
Official Olympic Reports
International Olympic Committee results database

Nations at the 1956 Summer Olympics
1956
Summer Olympics